The Gereg is the debut album by the Hu, released on September 13, 2019. The album takes its name from the diplomatic passport carried by Mongolian nobles and officials during the 13th century.

A Deluxe Edition of the album was released on July 10, 2020, featuring guest vocals by Jacoby Shaddix, From Ashes to New, and Lzzy Hale, as well as acoustic versions of three tracks.

Loudwire named it one of the 50 best rock albums of 2019.

Track listing 
All songs are composed and produced by The Hu and B. Dashdondog, except where indicated.

Personnel 
The Hu
 Ts. Galbadrakh aka "Gala" – ayanga morin khuur, throat singing
 G. Nyamjantsan aka "Jaya" – tumur khuur, Tsuur, throat singing
 B. Enkhsaikhan aka "Enkush" – gal morin khuur, throat singing
 N. Temuulen aka "Temka" – baigali tovshuur, programming, mixing

Production
 B. Dashdondog aka "Dashka" – programming, mixing, engineering
 Ts. Shinebayar – engineering
 Ts. Oyunbayar – engineering
 Howie Weinberg – mastering

Charts

References

External links 

2019 debut albums
The Hu albums
Eleven Seven Label Group albums